Ajavasnan Matsya is the first collection of poems by Pravin Pandya in Gujarati. It was published by Kavilok Trust in May 1994.

Content 
The book consists of 19 poems, composed in both metrical and nonmetrical form. Pandya wrote the poems during 1979 to 1992.

Award 
The book won the Ushnas Prize (1994–95) instituted by Gujarati Sahitya Parishad.

References

1994 poetry books
Gujarati-language poetry collections
Indian poetry collections
1994 in India
20th-century Indian books